The Louise Hay Award is a mathematics award established in 1990 by the Association for Women in Mathematics in recognition of contributions as a math educator.
The award was created in honor of Louise Hay.

Recipients 
The following women have been honored with the Hay Award:

See also

 List of mathematics awards

References 

Awards of the Mathematical Association of America
Awards and prizes of the Association for Women in Mathematics
Mathematics education awards
1990 establishments in the United States
Awards established in 1990